Mikael Granskog (born 26 March 1961) is a retired Finnish football defender.

References 

1961 births
Living people
Swedish-speaking Finns
Finnish footballers
IFK Mariehamn players
IFK Norrköping players
Väsby IK players
Finland under-21 international footballers
Finland international footballers
Association football defenders
Finnish expatriate footballers
Expatriate footballers in Sweden
Finnish expatriate sportspeople in Sweden
Ykkönen players
Kakkonen players
Allsvenskan players
Superettan players
People from Mariehamn
Sportspeople from Åland